Philadelphia Municipal Airport  is a public use airport in Neshoba County, Mississippi, United States. It is owned by the City of Philadelphia and located two nautical miles (4 km) northwest of its central business district. This airport is included in the National Plan of Integrated Airport Systems for 2011–2015, which categorized it as a general aviation facility.

Although many U.S. airports use the same three-letter location identifier for the FAA and IATA, this airport is assigned MPE by the FAA but has no designation from the IATA (which assigned MPE to Griswold Airport in Madison, Connecticut).

Facilities and aircraft 
Philadelphia Municipal Airport covers an area of 60 acres (24 ha) at an elevation of 458 feet (140 m) above mean sea level. It has one runway designated 18/36 with an asphalt surface measuring 5,001 by 75 feet (1,524 x 23 m).

For the 12-month period ending March 20, 2012, the airport had 13,300 aircraft operations, an average of 36 per day: 98.5% general aviation and 1.5% military. At that time there were 8 aircraft based at this airport: 75% single-engine, 12.5% multi-engine, and 12.5% jet.

See also 
 List of airports in Mississippi

References

External links 
 Aerial image as of March 1996 from USGS The National Map
 
 

Airports in Mississippi
Buildings and structures in Neshoba County, Mississippi
Transportation in Neshoba County, Mississippi
Philadelphia, Mississippi